Frederick Arthur MacKenzie (1869–1931, often spelled as McKenzie) was a correspondent active in the early 20th century who wrote several books on geopolitical developments in eastern Asia. He was born in Quebec, and described himself as "Scots-Canadian". He briefly contributed to the Pall Mall Gazette, and then for several years he worked with the Daily Mail as travelling correspondent in the Far East.

Mackenzie was one of the few Western journalists to cover the Russo-Japanese War from the Japanese side, and one of the few Western correspondents that wrote about the Korean resistance against Japan during the Japanese Rule. His last book was related to religious persecution in Soviet Russia. In 2014, he was posthumously awarded the Order of Merit for National Foundation by the Korean Government.

Career

Russo-Japanese War 
As a war correspondent for the Daily Mail, Frederick A. MacKenzie registered the Russo-Japanese War. During these years, he travelled to Korea and Manchuria with American writers Jack London and Robert L. Dunn. They were the only Western journalists witnessing the early stages of the conflict on the side of the Japanese army.

MacKenzie exalted the Japanese soldiers that fought in the war. He praised their education and observed the soft treatment given to captured Russian officers. He also remarked about the ability of Japanese soldiers to stand prolonged exertion.

Covering Korean resistance 

MacKenzie returned back to England after the Russo-Japanese War, but he visited Korea again to cover the Japanese intervention in the peninsula. He stayed in the Korean Empire for almost two years, from the summer of 1906 to the end of 1907.  During that time, he wrote about King Sunjong's coronation ceremony in July 1907, the righteous armies, and British journalist Ernest Thomas Bethell's deportation.

Frederick MacKenzie eyewitnessed the abuse of Japanese forces on his way to Icheon, despite Japan's attempts to obstruct the work of foreign journalists. He went to Chungju, Chungcheongbuk-do Province, where he met the righteous army soldiers in person.

MacKenzie took the only remaining photos of the righteous armies of Korea. He described their integrants as an example of what patriotism was, with "sparkling eyes and smiles".

In 1908, MacKenzie published The Tragedy of Korea, a book that accounts for the events that led to the destruction of the Korean Empire and the posterior Japanese rule on Korea.

In 1919, MacKenzie wrote another book about Korea's resistance against the Japanese rule: Korea's Fight For Freedom. In the book, he accounted for the spirit of independence of the Koreans in the March 1st Movement. In their writings, MacKenzie described with details the torture methods of Japanese, and he emphasized that the March 1st Movement was "a demonstration, not a riot", but Japanese police responded using their swords freely.

In 2014, the Korean Government awarded MacKenzie posthumously with the grade of Order of Independence, Order of Merit for National Foundation.

Religious persecution in Russia 
In 1930, MacKenzie published a book about religious persecution during the Bolshevism in Russia. In the preface of the book, he pointed out that the book was "a record, a protest, and an appeal".

The book is mainly based on the personal experiences of the author, who was in the Soviet State from 1921 until 1924. After that, he was established in Stockholm and he visited frequently Finland, Estonia, and Latvia, trying to keep in touch with the Russian situation.

As the Daily Mail took a strong position against Bolshevism in Russia, MacKenzie preferred not to be a correspondent of them for that research. Instead, he contacted Edward Price Bell of the Chicago Daily News, and Lord Beaverbrook and R. D. Blurnfeld of the Daily Express. This partnership allows him to visit Moscow for the winter, and he stayed there for many years.

Anti-Japanese accusations 
After writing Tragedy of Korea, critics attacked MacKenzie as exaggerating facts. He was also signaled as "anti-Japanese". He answered the critics saying:

Selected works
Sober by Act of Parliament, 1894
Paul Kruger: His Life Story, 1899, about Paul Kruger
"The Worst Street in London", Daily Mail, 16 July 1901
American Invaders, 1902
From Tokyo to Tiflis: Uncensored Letters from the War, Hurst and Blackett,1905
The Unveiled East, Hutchinson & Co., London, 1907
The Tragedy of Korea, 1908
The Colonial Policy of Japan in Korea, 1906
The Peace Conference - The Claim of the Korean People and National Petition, April 1919
Korea's Fight For Freedom, 1920
Pussyfoot Johnson: Crusader, Reformer, a Man Among Men, 1920 (about William E. Johnson)
The Mystery of the Daily Mail, 1896–1921, 1921
Russia Before Dawn, 1922
The Russian Crucifixion: The Full Story of the Persecution of Religion Under Bolshevism,1930

References

External links

 

 Short bio

1869 births
1931 deaths
Writers from Quebec
Recipients of the Order of Merit for National Foundation
Korean independence activists